Patrick Sky is the self-titled debut album of Patrick Sky, released in 1965 on the Vanguard label.

Track listing
All tracks composed by Patrick Sky; except where indicated:

Side one
 "Many a Mile" 
 "Hangin' Round"
 "Love Will Endure" 
 "Reuben" (Traditional)
 "Rattlesnake Mountain" (Traditional)
 "Everytime" (Tom Paxton)

Side two
 "Come With Me Love" 
 "Nectar of God"
 "Separation Blues"
 "Ballad of Ira Hayes" (Peter LaFarge)
 "Words Without Music" (Dayle Stanley)
 "Wreck of the 97" (Dewey, Noell, Wittier)

Personnel
Patrick Sky - guitar, vocals, harmonica
Ralph Rinzler - mandolin on "Come With Me Love" and "Wreck of the 97"

1965 debut albums
Patrick Sky albums
Vanguard Records albums